This is a list of members of the Irish House of Commons between 1585 and 1586. 

The following present-day counties were not represented - Armagh, Donegal, Fermanagh, Leitrim, Londonderry, Monaghan and Tyrone.

References

Sources 
 
 Tracts relating to Ireland, Irish Archaeological Society, 1841-43, Volume 2, page 139

585